"One Way Track" is a song recorded by Canadian country music group Prairie Oyster. It was released in 1996 as the second single from their fifth studio album, Blue Plate Special. It peaked at number 4 on the RPM Country Tracks chart in March 1997.

Chart performance

Year-end charts

References

1996 singles
Prairie Oyster songs
Songs written by Willie P. Bennett
1996 songs